The 49th Texas Legislature met from January 9, 1945, to June 5, 1945. All members present during this session were elected in the 1944 general elections.

Sessions

Regular Session: January 9, 1945 - June 5, 1945

Party summary

Senate

House

Officers

Senate
 Lieutenant Governor: John Lee Smith (D) 
 President Pro Tempore: George C. Moffett (D), William Graves (D)

House
 Speaker of the House: Claud H. Gilmer (D)

Members

Senate

Dist. 1
 Howard A. Carney (D), Atlanta

Dist. 2
 Wardlow Lane (D), Center

Dist. 3
 Ben Ramsey (D), San Augustine

Dist. 4
 Allan Shivers (D), Port Arthur

Dist. 5
 Roger A. Knight (D), Madisonville

Dist. 6
 James E. Taylor (D), Kerens

Dist. 7
 T. C. Chadick (D), Quitman

Dist. 8
 A. M. Aiken, Jr. (D), Paris

Dist. 9
 Charles R. Jones (D), Bonham

Dist. 10
 G. C. Morris (D), Greenville

Dist. 11
 William Graves (D), Dallas

Dist. 12
 A. B. Crawford (D), Granbury

Dist. 13
 Kyle Vick (D), Waco

Dist. 14
 Joseph Alton York (D), Bryan

Dist. 15
 Louis Sulak (D), La Grange

Dist. 16
 Weaver Moore (D), Houston

Dist. 17
 William Stone (D), Galveston

Dist. 18
 Fred Mauritz (D), Ganado

Dist. 19
 Rudolph A. Weinert (D), Seguin

Dist. 20
 James A. Stanford (D), Austin

Dist. 21
 Buster Brown (D), Temple

Dist. 22
 Royston Lanning (D), Jacksboro

Dist. 23
 George Moffett (D), Chillicothe

Dist. 24
 Pat Bullock (D), Colorado City

Dist. 25
 Penrose Metcalfe (D), San Angelo

Dist. 26
 J. Franklin Spears (D), San Antonio

Dist. 27
 Rogers Kelly (D), Edinburg

Dist. 28
 Jesse Martin (D), Fort Worth

Dist. 29
 Henry L. Winfield (D), Fort Stockton

Dist. 30
 Sterling J. Parrish (D), Lubbock

Dist. 31
 Grady Hazlewood (D), Amarillo

House
The House was composed of 150 Democrats.

House members included future Governor Preston Smith.

Sources
 Legislative Reference Library of Texas,

External links

49th Texas Legislature
1945 in Texas
1945 U.S. legislative sessions